Tatyana  Mikhailovna of Russia (5 January 1636 – 23 August 1706) was a Russian Tsarevna. She was heavily involved with the politics of the Romanov court during the reigns of her brother Alexis and the regency of her niece Sophia.

Biography
Tatyana was born the daughter of Tsar Michael of Russia and Eudoxia Streshneva, and the sister of Tsar Aleksei I of Russia.

In contemporary Muscovite custom, Russian princesses were completely secluded from the world outside of the women's quarters of the terem, not allowed contact with men nor allowed to marry. Tatyana followed these rules, but she was also able to exert some degree of influence at court. She was known as a supporter of the reforms of Patriarch Nikon of Moscow. She had a good relationship with her brother tsar Alexei.

Sophia's regency
During the regency of her niece Sophia, she reportedly exercised some degree of influence at court, where she was treated as the senior female member at court in etiquette matters and given precedence by regent Sophia before the dowager Tsaritsa Natalya.

When Sophia was deposed by tsar Peter the Great in 1689, Foy de la Neuville reported that Sophia sent her sister, Tsarevna Marfa, and aunts, Anna and Tatyana, to mediate. Tatyana tried to mediate and prevent Peter from imprisoning her niece Tsarevna Marfa in a convent, but without success; she lost her influence as Peter's reforms progressed society from the old way and the old court.

Death
Tatyana died in the early hours of 24 August 1706, and was interred at Ascension Convent near the Spassky Gate in Moscow on the same day. In 1930, her sarcophagus was moved to the basement of the Kremlin's Cathedral of the Archangel. When archaeologists opened her sarcophagus, her body was found dressed in green Chinese silks.

References

Notes

Bibliography

Further reading
 Григорян В. Г. Романовы. Биографический справочник.— М.:АСТ,2007.

1636 births
1706 deaths
Russian tsarevnas
House of Romanov
Royalty from Moscow
17th-century Russian people